H. George Anderson (born March 10, 1932) was the second Presiding Bishop of the Evangelical Lutheran Church in America from October 1995 to October 2001. Prior to his term as Presiding Bishop, he was the president of Luther College in Decorah, Iowa and on the faculty of Lutheran Theological Southern Seminary, serving as president from 1970 to 1982.

Biography

Early life and education 
Anderson was born in Los Angeles, California on March 10, 1932, and adopted by Reuben and Frances Anderson. Anderson, a Phi Beta Kappa graduate from Yale, earned graduate degrees from the University of Pennsylvania and the Lutheran Theological Seminary at Philadelphia, and is known as a translator and author of many works on Lutheran history. At the time of his election as presiding bishop, he was president of Luther College, having served in that capacity from 1982 to 1996. Prior to his tenure at Luther he was on the faculty of Lutheran Theological Southern Seminary, Columbia, South Carolina, and served as its president from 1970 to 1982.

Publications 
As bishop, Anderson wrote a regular column in "The Lutheran" magazine, and completed "A Good Time to Be the Church, A Conversation with Bishop H. George Anderson," Augsburg Books, February 1997. Other works include co-authorship of several volumes of the "Lutherans and Catholics in Dialogue" series, many scholarly essays, book chapters and translations over the course of three decades.

Personal 
Anderson is currently retired and living in Decorah, Iowa.

Notes 
 http://www.elca.org/About/History/Former-Presiding-Bishops/The-Rev-H-George-Anderson

References

External links
{http://www.elca.org/About/History/Former-Presiding-Bishops/The-Rev-H-George-Anderson}

1932 births
Living people
Writers from Los Angeles
Presiding Bishops of the Evangelical Lutheran Church in America
20th-century American Lutheran clergy
Lutheran Theological Seminary at Philadelphia alumni
Yale University alumni
University of Pennsylvania alumni